Fundamental figure of Chilean music, or "Figura fundamental de la música chilena", is an award presented annually by the Sociedad Chilena de Autores e Intérpretes Musicales (SCD), recognizing Chilean artists who have had important influence and legacy in the country's musical history. The selection is made by the organization's board of directors.

Past recipients of the honor are:

 1987 José Goles
 1988 Luis Aguirre Pinto
 1989 Francisco Flores del Campo
 1990 Vicente Bianchi
 1991 Donato Román y Ester Soré
 1992 Valentín Trujillo
 1993 Margot Loyola
 1994 Gabriela Pizarro
 1995 Antonio Prieto
 1996 Dúo Rey-Silva
 1997 Los Jaivas
 1998 Hernán "Nano" Núñez
 1999 Sonia y Myriam 
 2000 Fernando Rosas
 2001 Luis Advis
 2002 Los Ángeles Negros
 2003 Isabel y Ángel Parra
 2004 Patricio Manns
 2005 Lucho Gatica
 2006 Buddy Richard
 2007 Silvia Infantas
 2008 Los Huasos Quincheros
 2009 Palmenia Pizarro
 2010 Tito Fernández
 2011 Cecilia Pantoja
 2012 Calatambo Albarracín
 2013 Fernando García
 2014 Roberto Lecaros
 2015 Gastón Guzmán
 2016 Willy Bascuñán
 2017 Quilapayún
 2018 Jorge González. 
 2019 Carmen Barros
 2020 Eduardo Gatti

In 2017, as part of the organization's 30th anniversary celebration, the SCD published a book Fundamentales de la Música Chilena reviewing the contributions of each of the honorees.

References

Chilean awards
1987 establishments in Chile
Awards established in 1987
South American music awards